Pokrovskaya is a rural locality (a village) in Beketovskoye Rural Settlement, Vozhegodsky District, Vologda Oblast, Russia. The population was 39 as of 2002.

Geography 
Pokrovskaya is located 77 km southwest of Vozhega (the district's administrative centre) by road. Kuritsino is the nearest rural locality.

References 

Rural localities in Vozhegodsky District